Christian Fredrik Michelet (23 June 1863 – 25 July 1927) was a Norwegian lawyer and politician for the Conservative Party.

He was born in Christiania (now Oslo) as a son of Colonel Georg Ove von Ramel Michelet (1830–1908) and Anna Beate Stang (1838–1866). He was a paternal grandson of Christian Fredrik Michelet (1792–1874) and a maternal grandson of Thomas Andersen Stang. He was a nephew of Carl Johan Michelet, first cousin of Major Christian Fredrik Michelet and second cousin of theologian Simon Michelet. In May 1888 he married Betzy Holmsen (1867–1951).

He finished his secondary education at Aars og Voss in 1881, and graduated with the cand.jur. degree in 1886. After graduation, he was a deputy judge and junior solicitor for Nils Nicolaysen, before opening his own lawyer's firm Michelet og Harbitz together with Edmund Harbitz in 1890. From 1892 he was a barrister with access to Supreme Court cases. In 1916 the firm changed its name to Michelet, Skavlan og Blom.

Michelet moved to the property Birkeli at Fornebu in 1894. He was elected to Bærum municipal council in 1897, and served as mayor from 1899 to 1910. He was an elector in the 1900 election. He was elected to the Parliament of Norway from the constituency Bærum og Follo in 1909, and was re-elected in 1912, 1915 and 1918. From 1920 to 1921, when the Bahr Halvorsen's First Cabinet held office, Michelet was Minister of Foreign Affairs. He later became Minister of Foreign Affairs again in Bahr Halvorsen's Second Cabinet (1923) and Berge's Cabinet (1923–1924). After Prime Minister Otto Bahr Halvorsen died, Michelet also served as acting Prime Minister of Norway from 24 March to 29 May 1923. In 1926–1927 he was tried in the impeachment case against seven members of Berge's Cabinet, but was acquitted.

He was a board member of Forsikringsselskapet Norden (1913–1927), Den norske Creditbank (1907–1918, chairman since 1912), Elektrisk Bureau and Tofte Cellulosefabrik.

Michelet was decorated as a Commander, First Class of the Order of St. Olav (1921), Commander of the Order of the Dannebrog, Knight of the Order of Vasa and the Order of the Polar Star. He died in 1927 from an accidental shot from his own gun. His wife married B. Johan R. Koren.

References

1863 births
1927 deaths
Lawyers from Oslo
University of Oslo alumni
Members of the Storting
Government ministers of Norway
Conservative Party (Norway) politicians
Mayors of places in Akershus
Bærum politicians
Norwegian people of French descent
Commanders of the Order of the Dannebrog
Knights of the Order of Vasa
Knights of the Order of the Polar Star
Firearm accident victims
Accidental deaths in Norway
Deaths by firearm in Norway